Trans-Love Energies is the fifth album by British electronica band Death in Vegas. It was released on 26 September 2011 in the United Kingdom via Portobello Records. The track "Your Loft My Acid", featuring guest vocals by Katie Stelmanis, was released as a digital-only single on 18 September 2011. This was the band's first album in seven years, after Satan's Circus in 2004.

Track listing

Singles
 "Your Loft My Acid" (digital only, 18 September 2011)

Personnel
 Richard Fearless – production, vocals (tracks 1, 4, 5, 7, 9, 10), synthesizer (tracks 1, 4, 5, 8, 9), guitar (track 2), drum programming (tracks 6, 9), keyboards (tracks 3, 6), photography
 James Greenwood – programming, synthesizers (tracks 1, 3–5, 8, 9), drum programming (tracks 6, 9), keyboards (tracks 3, 6)
 Katie Stelmanis – vocals (track 3, 6)
 Travis Caine – vocals & guitar (track 10)
 Bill Skibbe – mixing (tracks 1, 3–10), synthesizers (tracks 5 and 8)
 Ian Button – guitar (tracks 2, 9, 10)
 M. Sord – drums (tracks 2, 4, 5, 9)
 Shahzad Ismaily – bouzouki & banjo (track 1), percussion (track 2), bass (tracks 2, 9)
 Morgan Wiley – synthesizers (track 1), keyboards (track 10)
 Tim Fairplay – Roland TR-808 synthesizers (tracks 3–7)
 Brent Arnold – cello (track 1)
 Terry Miles – keyboards (track 10)
 Doug Marvin – drums (track 10)
 FearlessBeaven – design

Additional credits for the Deluxe Edition
 Richard Fearless – production, vocals (tracks 12, 15, 18–20), synthesizer (tracks 12–20), guitar (track 2), drum programming (tracks 13, 17, 18), keyboards (tracks 3, 6), photography
 James Greenwood – programming, synthesizers (tracks 12, 20), drum programming (tracks 13, 17), keyboards (track 1)
 Katie Stelmanis – vocals (track 11, 18)
 Angela Boyle – vocals (track 19)
 Travis Caine – guitar (track 17), bass (track 15)
 Bill Skibbe – mixing (tracks 15, 20), synthesizers (track 16), guitar & piano (track 20)
 Finn Eiles – mixing (tracks 11, 12, 15, 20)
 Steve Dub – mixing (tracks 13, 14)
 Ian Button – guitar (track 17)
 M. Sord – drums (tracks 16, 17, 20)
 Shahzad Ismaily – bouzouki & banjo (track 15), percussion (track 2), bass (tracks 17)
 Morgan Wiley – synthesizers (track 15)
 Tim Fairplay – Roland TR-808 synthesizers (tracks 11, 12, 16, 20)
 Brent Arnold – cello (track 15)
 Jessica Ruffins – bass (track 20)

References

External links
 

Death in Vegas albums
2011 albums